Sinhalestes orientalis, the emerald Sri Lanka spreadwing, is a monotypic species of damselfly in the family Lestidae. The species was thought to be extinct since none have been found since it was first scientifically described in 1862. However, in 2012 this species was re-discovered by a young odonatologist Amila Sumanapala from the  Peak Wilderness Sanctuary, Sri Lanka.

It is endemic to Sri Lanka and so far it has only been recorded from Peak Wilderness Sanctuary and its surrounding areas.

References

Sources

Sumanapala, A. P. and Bedjanič, M. (2013). Rediscovery of a long lost endemic damselfly Sinhalestes orientalis (Hagen in Selys, 1862) from Peak Wilderness Sanctuary, Sri Lanka (Zygoptera: Lestidae). Asian Journal of Conservation Biology. Vol. 2 (1): 44–47.

Lestidae
Damselflies of Sri Lanka
Critically endangered insects
Critically endangered biota of Asia
Monotypic Odonata genera
Taxa named by Frederic Charles Fraser
Taxonomy articles created by Polbot